The Shamrock is a 1777 Irish play or pasticcio opera by John O'Keeffe. It was first staged on 15 April 1777 at Crow Street Theatre in Dublin. According to White (1983), it is unsure whether the work was performed as a straight play or as a pasticcio opera to music by William Shield, as in its altered version as an afterpiece for the London stage, The Poor Soldier (1783).

References

Bibliography
 Brasmer, William & Osborne, William (eds.): The Poor Soldier (1783) (Madison, Wisconsin: A-R Editions, 1978)

1777 operas
English comic operas
Operas set in the British Isles
Plays by John O'Keeffe